An Han-yeong (born 19 March 1948) is a South Korean wrestler. He competed in the men's Greco-Roman 57 kg at the 1976 Summer Olympics.

References

External links

1948 births
Living people
South Korean male sport wrestlers
Olympic wrestlers of South Korea
Wrestlers at the 1976 Summer Olympics
Place of birth missing (living people)
Asian Games silver medalists for South Korea
Asian Games medalists in wrestling
Wrestlers at the 1974 Asian Games
Medalists at the 1974 Asian Games
20th-century South Korean people
21st-century South Korean people